Edward Ray may refer to:

Ed Ray (academic) (born 1944), American economist and academic administrator
Ted Ray (golfer) (1877–1943), British professional golfer
Eddie Ray (born 1947), former professional American football player
Frank Edward "Ed" Ray (1921–2012), American bus driver who saved a group of students during the 1976 Chowchilla kidnapping
Edward Wiley Ray (born 1926), record company executive, record producer and songwriter

See also
Edward Wray, Groom of the Bedchamber to James I
Ted Ray (disambiguation)